Jack Robinson is a name present in two common figures of speech. When referring to Jack Robinson, it is used to represent quickness. In contrast, the phrase "(A)round Jack Robinson's barn" has the opposite connotation, implying slowness, as it is often used to refer to circumlocution, circumvention, or doing things in roundabout or unnecessarily complicated ways.

Etymology and common variants

Connoting quickness
Multiple citations explain references to Jack Robinson as meaning quickness of thought or deed.  The normal usage is, "(something is done) faster than you can say Jack Robinson", or otherwise, "before you can say Jack Robinson". The phrase can be traced back to the eighteenth century.

Examples
  The phrase first appeared in print in 1778 in Frances Burney’s novel Evelina (“I’d do it as soon as say Jack Robinson”), but probably was in wide use before that time.
 According to Grose's Classical Dictionary (1785), the reference is to an individual whose social visits were so short that he would be departing almost before his arrival was announced.
 Supposedly, an English gentleman of the early nineteenth century named Jack Robinson was a person who changed his mind. A person had to be quick to catch him in a decision.
 Sir John (Jack) Robinson, the Constable of the Tower of London from 1660–79, held at the same time a judiciary appointment in the nearby City of London, and could and did condemn a felon in the City, then have him transported to the Tower where he commanded the execution, with the entire process completed "faster than you can say Jack Robinson".
 John "Jack" Robinson (1727–1802) was Joint Secretary to the Treasury in England from 1770 to 1782 and regularly acted as a Government Whip, responsible for organising elections and political patronage. Of his reputation for political fixing, Nathaniel Wraxall wrote: "No man in the House ... knew so much of its original composition, the means by which every individual attained his seat, and, in many instances, how far and through what channels he might prove accessible." Therefore, fixing something "faster than you can say 'Jack Robinson'" was very fast indeed.
 Yet another story relates the origin of the phrase to a comic song of the 1840s, written and performed by Tom Hudson, which tells of a sailor who returns from a voyage to discover that his wife has married another sailor in his absence.

Variants
The similar phrase, "Before you can say  'Knife!'", dates from at least 1850, when it appeared in Charles Dickens' Household Words.

In the late nineteenth century we have Sooner than ye'll say “Jock Hector!”, He'll them describe or draw their picture.

Connoting slowness or roundaboutness
In contrast, the phrase "(A)round Jack Robinson's barn" has the opposite connotation, implying slowness, as it is often used to refer to circumlocution, circumvention, or doing things in roundabout or unnecessarily complicated ways. In response to an inquiry by Ken Greenwald (a forum moderator at WordWizard), Joan Houston Hall (Editor of the Dictionary of American Regional English (DARE) project at the University of Wisconsin at Madison) researched the term's etymology. Her findings are listed below, chronologically.

Examples

 Advertisement.

Variant
Hall also found numerous references to a more common variant, "Robin Hood's barn", which she noted can be found in the Dictionary of American Regional English, Vol. 4, page 608.

References

English-language slang
English-language idioms
Timekeeping
Jack tales